Heavy Montréal (stylized as Heavy MONTRÉAL, formerly known as Heavy MTL) is a two-day, summer heavy metal and hard rock music festival held annually at Parc Jean-Drapeau in Montreal, Quebec, Canada. It also includes various other events at different venues across the city. The "MTL" in the former name, Heavy MTL, served as both an abbreviation for "Montreal" and "Metal." In 2014, the festival was officially renamed as "Heavy Montréal".

History 
Since the festival's first edition in 2008, Heavy Montréal, known until 2014 as "Heavy MTL," has seen some of the world's most successful heavy metal acts, such as Iron Maiden, Mötley Crüe, Disturbed, Dethklok, Rob Zombie, Korn, Avenged Sevenfold, Metallica, Slayer, Megadeth, Alice Cooper, KISS, Motörhead, Godsmack, In Flames, Slipknot, Marilyn Manson, Deftones, System of a Down, Five Finger Death Punch, Children of Bodom and BABYMETAL.

In 2011, a sister event, Heavy T.O., was created for Downsview Park in Toronto, Ontario, Canada. Both events were held during the same weekends, with most bands playing one day in Montreal and the other in Toronto. Despite the Toronto event's popularity, however, promoters ceased operations there after the festival's 2012 incarnation.

For the 2014 festival, Heavy MTL was officially rebranded as "Heavy Montréal". This was done as an "evolution" of the festival, with efforts made to include a wide array of styles in its programming.

The festival took a one-year hiatus in 2017, citing the renovations taking place that year in Parc Jean-Drapeau and the increase in other cultural events due to Montreal celebrating its . In November 2019, event promotions company Evenko announced that Heavy Montreal would not occur in 2020, in part due to "the number of non-festival metal/rock concerts that will be announced over the next few months", said Evenko chief operating officer Jacques Aubé .

Past editions

2019

The lineup included:

2018

Heavy Montreal returned in 2018 after a one year hiatus.

The lineup included:

 Replaced Avenged Sevenfold

2016
The 2016 edition of Heavy Montréal took place on 6–7 August 2016.    For 2016 the festival was held on a new site in Parc Jean-Drapeau, la Plaine des Jeux.

The lineup included:

2015 

The 2015 edition of Heavy Montréal took place over three days from 7 to 9 August 2015.

The lineup included:

2014

The lineup included:

 Replaced Dirty Rotten Imbeciles

2013
For the 2013 edition, Heavy MTL also featured a live pro wrestling event showcasing men and women of the Montreal independent wrestling scene.

2012

 Replaced Dethklok
 Replaced Lamb of God
 Replaced High on Fire

2011

 Replaced The Sword

2010

2009
Due to the high number of metal live shows performed in Montreal during the year (Metallica, AC/DC, KISS, Dream Theater, Marilyn Manson, Motörhead and many more) it was announced that the festival would not take place in 2009 and return in 2010.

2008

See also
 Osheaga Festival, music festival at Parc Jean-Drapeau
 ÎleSoniq Music Festival, music festival at Parc Jean-Drapeau
 Heavy Montreal, music festival at Parc Jean-Drapeau
 Piknic Électronik, weekly electronic music festival at Parc Jean-Drapeau during summer

References
Citations

External links
 Heavy Montréal Homepage
 Heavy Montréal on Myspace
 2012 Heavy MTL Line-up and preview

Music festivals in Montreal
Heavy metal festivals in Canada
Rock festivals in Canada
Music festivals established in 2008